Voorhees may refer to:

Places
 Voorhees Township, Kansas, located in Stevens County, Kansas
 Voorhees Township, New Jersey
 Voorhees (CDP), New Jersey, located in Somerset County
 Voorhees Mall, a section of Rutgers University's College Avenue Campus in New Brunswick
 Voorhees State Park, New Jersey

Buildings and institutions
 Voorhees Chapel, the college chapel at Jamestown College in Jamestown, North Dakota
 Voorhees Chapel (Rutgers), a college chapel on Rutgers University's Douglass Residential College campus in New Brunswick, New Jersey
 Voorhees Hall, a building on Rutgers University's College Avenue Campus in New Brunswick, New Jersey
 Voorhees Town Center, a regional shopping mall and planned residential area in Voorhees Township, New Jersey
Voorhees High School, Lebanon Township, New Jersey
Voorhees College, Denmark, South Carolina

People
 Voorhees (surname), includes a list of people with the name

Other uses
 Voorhees (band), a hardcore punk band from Durham, England
 "Voorhees", a song from the album Frames by Oceansize
 Voorhees, Gmelin and Walker, New York architectural firm

See also

Voorhies (disambiguation)
Voorheis
Voorhis